"Jimmy Lee" is a song written by Narada Michael Walden, Lisa Walden, Preston Glass, and Jeffrey Cohen for American singer Aretha Franklin, who recorded it for her 1986 album Aretha. Produced by Narada Michael Walden, the track was released as the lead single from the album in late 1986.

Personnel
Aretha Franklin – vocals
Walter Afanasieff – acoustic piano, synthesizer
David Sancious – synthesizer
Corrado Rustici – Charvel MIDI guitar synthesizer
Randy Jackson – acoustic bass
Narada Michael Walden – drums, acoustic piano intro
Preston Glass – bells
Kenny G – tenor saxophone
Marc Russo – alto saxophone
David Wallace – trombone
Jerry Hey – trumpet and horn arrangement

Charts
"Jimmy Lee" reached No. 28 on the Billboard Hot 100 singles chart, No. 2 on the R&B singles chart, and No. 19 on the Dance/Club Play chart in early 1987.

References

Aretha Franklin songs
1986 songs
1986 singles
Song recordings produced by Narada Michael Walden
Songs written by Narada Michael Walden
Songs written by Preston Glass